Raul de Mesquita Boesel (born 4 December 1957) is a Brazilian former racing driver who raced for the March and Ligier Formula One teams and later raced in Champ Car and the Indy Racing League.

He won the 1987 World Sportscar Championship and the 1988 24 Hours of Daytona.

Personal and early life
Raul Boesel was born on 4 December 1957 in Curitiba, Brazil as the son of Jorny and Elizadea de Mesquita Boesel. Boesel had a brief career in equestrian show jumping winning state championships and other competitions.

He lives in Key Biscayne, Florida with his wife Vera and children Raul Boesel Jr and Gabriela where they have resided since 1988. He owns a Cigarette 38 Top Gun boat.

Career

He studied engineering, gave up his degree and went on to motor racing. He entered into first ever season of the Brazilian Stock Car championship in 1979.

He moved to Britain in 1980 to race in Formula Ford 1600 and in 1981 entered Formula 3 and finished third in the championship. In November 1981 he tested for McLaren and entered the March team, only to switch in 1983 to Ligier. At the end of the year he went to the United States to race in CART.

In 1987 he switched to World Sportscar Championship with Jaguar and won the title with five victories. In 1988 he won the 24 Hours of Daytona in a Jaguar XJR-9, along with Martin Brundle and John Nielsen. That year he also returned to CART and finished third at Indianapolis in 1989. In 1991 he finished second in Le Mans 24 Hours with Jaguar and returned to CART, finishing fifth in the 1993 series, although never winning a race. He raced in CART until 1998, when he went to Indy Racing League. Because of this, he has multiple starts in the Indy 500. His last race in CART was at the 1999 Marlboro 500 at Fontana.

Autódromo Internacional de Curitiba, a racing circuit in Curitiba, is officially nicknamed "Circuito Raul Boesel" (Raul Boesel circuit) in honour of his success in Europe.

Boesel ended his professional racing career in 2005 after returning to Stock Car Brasil, although he still competes in some races after his retirement.

Afterwards, he often comments about various racing categories. In 2007, he started a career as a disc jockey.

Racing record

Complete Formula One results
(key)

American open-wheel racing
(key) (Races in bold indicate pole position; races in italics indicate fastest lap.)

CART

Indy Racing League

Indianapolis 500

Complete World Sportscar Championship results
(key) (Races in bold indicate pole position) (Races in italics indicate fastest lap)

24 Hours of Le Mans results

References

External links

 Raul Boesel official website

1957 births
Living people
Sportspeople from Curitiba
Brazilian racing drivers
Brazilian Formula One drivers
British Formula Three Championship drivers
Brazilian Champ Car drivers
Brazilian IndyCar Series drivers
Indianapolis 500 drivers
24 Hours of Le Mans drivers
Grand Prix Masters drivers
Stock Car Brasil drivers
Brazilian DJs
24 Hours of Daytona drivers
European Le Mans Series drivers
Brazilian expatriate sportspeople in the United States
March Formula One drivers
Ligier Formula One drivers
World Sportscar Championship drivers
Jaguar Racing drivers
Rahal Letterman Lanigan Racing drivers
Andretti Autosport drivers